Botolan is a Sambalic language spoken by 32,867 (SIL 2000) Sambal, primarily in the Zambal municipalities of Botolan and Cabangan in the Philippines. Language status is 5 (developing).

Varieties
The Ayta people of sitio Villar, Botolan, and sitio Kakilingan, Santa Fe, Cabangan also speak a Botolan dialect with some unique lexical items.

Ethnologue reports Ayta Hambali (Hambali Botolan), Sambali Botolan as dialects of Sambal Botolan. Among themselves, Ayta Hambali reportedly use some words that are similar to Ayta, Mag-Anchi.

Phonology

Botolan has 20 phonemes: 16 consonants and four vowels. Syllable structure is relatively simple. Each syllable contains at least a consonant and a vowel.

Vowels

Botolan has four vowels. They are:
/a/ an open front unrounded vowel similar to English father
/e/ a close-mid front unrounded vowel similar to German 
/i/ a close front unrounded vowel similar to English machine
/u/ (written as ‘o’) a close back unrounded vowel similar to English flute

Consonants

Below is a chart of Botolan consonants. All the stops are unaspirated. The velar nasal occurs in all positions including at the beginning of a word.

Note: Consonants  and  can sometimes interchange as they were once allophones.

Stress

Stress is phonemic in Botolan. Word stress is very important; it differentiates homonyms, e.g.

Historical sound changes

Sample texts

The Lord's Prayer

Version from Matthew

Philippine national proverb

Below is a translation in Botolan of the Philippine national proverb "He who does not acknowledge his beginnings will not reach his destination," followed by the original in Tagalog.

Botolan: 
Tagalog:

See also

Languages of the Philippines

References

External links
Grammar sketch of Botolan found on Carl Rubino's homepage
Sample recordings from the GRN Network, in Botolan
Hay Halita nin Diyos, Bible verses in Botolan

Sambalic languages
Languages of Zambales